A. Le Coq Sports Hall is a sports hall in Tartu, Estonia. The hall is named after its supporter: A. Le Coq.

The hall was opened in 2006. The hall is designed by Eero Palm. The hall is built by AS Randväli & Karema.

The hall has seats for 2000 people.

References

External links
A. Le Coq Sport Spordimaja at Estonian Sports Registry

Sports venues in Estonia
Indoor arenas in Estonia
Buildings and structures in Tartu
Volleyball venues in Estonia
Basketball venues in Estonia
2006 establishments in Estonia
Sports venues completed in 2006